Beyond the Tesseract is a text-based adventure game developed in 1983 by Canadian author David Lo for the TRS-80. The game was notable for its unique take on the genre and approach to mathematical entities and abstract concepts.
In one section the player must navigate a text adventure game, inside the text adventure game. In another the player, while asleep, derives a proof using physical representations of various symbolic logic components.

The game is intentionally vague using a VERB NOUN gameplay mechanic with a vocabulary of just 200.

In 1988 the game was ported to Atari ST, MS-DOS and Solaris environments and, in 2003, to interactive fiction standard of machine-independent Z-code.

Original release notes  

Scenario:
"You have reached the final part of your mission. You have
gained access to the complex, and all but the last procedure has
been performed.  Now comes a time of waiting, in which you must
search for the hidden 12-word message that will aid you at the
final step. But what choice will you make when that time comes?"

The scenario for the adventure is meant to be vague.  Once the
adventure has been completed, the scenario will hopefully become
clear.

Instructions:
This adventure recognizes the standard commands for moving
(N, E, S, W), taking inventory (I), manipulating objects (GET,
DROP, LOOK), and saving games (SAVE, LOAD), as well as many
others.  Use 2-word 'verb noun' commands, such as 'use stack' or
'get all'.  Only the first four letters of each word are
significant.  The adventure recognizes about 200 words, so if
one word does not work, try another.

Notes:
"The "stack" is an acronym for Space Time Activated Continuum
Key. You will find this object very useful.  Try the command
"use stack"."

This adventure is abstract and a bit on the technical side.
Basic knowledge of the names of interesting mathematical objects
would be a definite asset in solving the puzzles.  However,
detailed knowledge of the technical background is not necessary,
although it will make the adventure more enjoyable and reduce
the amount of comments of the form "Was that supposed to be funny
or what?  I don't get it."

There is no carry limit, no death traps, and over 200 words in
the program's vocabulary, so the player can hopefully concentrate on
solving the adventure instead of solving the program.  The map
of the adventure can be draw on a grid.  All it takes is a
little experimenting to put all the subsets of locations
together "logically".

History:
The idea of a mathematically abstract adventure came about
during the summer of 1983, when I was reading the book Godel, Escher, Bach: An Eternal Golden Braid.
I had just read an
article on writing adventures, and I thought about doing my own
article on adventure writing.  I did start on the article, and
one of the examples of how varied puzzles can be is a
mathematical adventure where the player has to "use a
probability function to cross a field of improbability to get to
a vortex."  Sadly the article was never finished, although
remnants of it can be found in the ADV.DOC file. I started
thinking more and more about a mathematically abstract
adventure, and Tesseract was born!

The very first adventure that I wrote was in 1982, titled "Hall
of the Mountain King" (find the Crystal of Light).  Tesseract
Version 1.0 was the second of the three TRS-80 BASIC adventures
that I wrote in a two-month adventure-frenzy during the summer
of 1983.  The first was "Project Triad" (defuse the bomb on the
space station), and the third was "Codename Intrepid" (deliver a
package to another agent).

References

External links
 
 Various versions of the game are available for free legal download

1980s interactive fiction
1983 video games
Atari ST games
DOS games
TRS-80 games
Video games about video games
Video games developed in Canada